HP calculator character set refers to various calculator character sets used in calculators manufactured by Hewlett-Packard.

These include:
 FOCAL character set, a character set used by some calculators supporting the FOCAL programming language between 1979 and 1995
 Modified HP Roman-8, a variant of Hewlett-Packard's Roman-8 used on some calculators between 1986 and 2015
 RPL character set, a character set used on various Hewlett-Packard RPL calculators between 1989 and 2015
 Unicode, a character set used on some new calculators since 2011 (39gII, Prime)

Notes

See also
 Calculator character sets